Dundathu is a rural locality in the Fraser Coast Region, Queensland, Australia.

Geography
The Mary River forms part of the southern boundary. Saltwater Creek forms a large part of the southern boundary as it flows east to join the Mary.

Road infrastructure
Maryborough–Hervey Bay Road (State Route 57) runs through from south to north.

References 

Fraser Coast Region
Localities in Queensland